Moorthiambalpuram - Panayakkottai is a village in the Orathanadu taluk of Thanjavur district, Tamil Nadu, India.

Demographics 

As per the 2001 census, Moorthiambalpuram had a total population of 2292 with 1168 males and 1124 females. The sex ratio was 962. The literacy rate was 67.81.

References 

 

Villages in Thanjavur district